The 2000–01 season was Sport Lisboa e Benfica's 97th season in existence, and the club's 67th consecutive season in the Primeira Liga. It ran from 1 July 2000 to 30 June 2001. Benfica competed domestically in the Primeira Liga and the Taça de Portugal. The club also participated in the UEFA Cup, by virtue of finishing third in that tournament the previous season.

The season is the worst in Benfica's illustrious history since the start of the Primeira Liga during 1934–35. The club switched managers two times. Jupp Heynckes was replaced by José Mourinho in September. Toni, who previously guided the club to a league title, took the reins in December. In the transfer market, young players like Marchena and Fernando Meira were brought in, and mixed with the experience of 31 year-old, Pierre van Hooijdonk, who arrived to replace Nuno Gomes, were meant to improve the team competitiveness. However, the biggest event of the pre-season was the release of João Pinto, the longest-serving player on the club, and the incumbent captain. This decision was poorly received by the fans, who criticized Heynckes and the president for the move. Both would leave the club in the following months. In the league campaign, the team lacked balance year-round and only briefly entered the league race, spending all but three weeks out the top three. Even the successful partnership of Pierre van Hooijdonk and João Tomás, with 36 goals between them, did not prevent the club from finishing in sixth place, 23 points behind winner Boavista. Consequently, Benfica missed out on UEFA competitions for the first time in 41 years (since the 1959–60 season).

Season summary

Pre-season
Preparations for a new Benfica season started in late-May 2000. Manager Jupp Heynckes remained for a second year, with more control this time in building up the squad. His choices caused immediate controversy, the biggest being the release of Benfica veteran João Pinto. Pinto was the incumbent team captain and the longest-serving player, who had been at Benfica since the 1992–93 season. José Manuel Delgado of Record predicted a difficult season for the German manager: "...he will have less tolerance from the fans than that offered to Artur Jorge (three match days), or Manuel José (four match days)..." He forwent internationals like Paulo Bento and Amaral, but indulged on Marchena, Meira and Van Hooijdonk. The last was intended to replace Nuno Gomes, who moved to Fiorentina after a successful run at Euro 2000. All of this spending happened in spite of club-wide financial difficulties, from missed salaries for Michael Thomas, to the basketball section of the club going months without pay.

The pre-season started on 7 July, with a schedule of 8 games. It included a match celebrating the 50th anniversary of Olympique Lyon, and the Carlsberg Belfast Challenge against Linfield and Liverpool. Benfica ended the pre-season on 11 August, with a draw against Aston Villa.

August–October
Benfica started their 2000–01 Primeira Liga campaign on the road in a Clássico match against FC Porto, on 19 August 2000. João Marcelino stated that Porto "...had some luck in the way they obtained their first goal (shot from Alenichev deflected off Calado and betrayed Enke)...", allowing them to manage the lead until the end. Benfica's first home game was against Beira-Mar on 27 August. At ten minutes into the second half of that game, Maniche's goal put Benfica up 3–0, setting them up for victory.

September began for Benfica with a visit to Leiria. It was a hard-fought match, in which referee José Leirós gave out twelve bookings. They narrowly escaped defeat when Chano scored in stoppage time. Benfica started their European season on 14 September in Sweden, with a 1–2 loss to host Halmstad. Benfica won their second home game of the season, on 18 September, against Estrela da Amadora, thanks to two goals scored by Van Hooijdonk in consecutive minutes near the end of regulation time. In the post-match interview, following weeks of fan pressure, club manager Heynckes lost his calm and proclaimed: "I can't take this club anymore. If they want me gone, I'll leave tomorrow." He was immediately let go, and replaced with 37-year-old José Mourinho. Former player Mozer joined him as assistant. It was Mourinho's first time as manager, having previously worked only as an interpreter for Bobby Robson and Louis van Gaal. His first game as manager was on the road against Boavista, in which his team lost 0–1 to a goal from ex-Benfica player Duda. The second leg of the UEFA Cup was a home game played on 28 September at the Estádio da Luz. It ended in a 2–2 draw and they were eliminated from the tournament – a result reminiscent of their 1997–98 season.

Benfica started October with a home game against Braga. The visitors took the lead in the first half, but João Tomás and Van Hooijdonk responded with a goal each, reversing the score in the second half. However, Braga went on to equalize with a last-minute goal, costing Benfica two points. On 15 October, Benfica won its third league game of the season by defeating Belenenses one–nil behind Marchena's goal. The team played Paços de Ferreira on the 21st, dropping two points in a 0–0 draw. Benfica played their last game of the month against Campomaiorense on the 29th, winning with a double from João Tomás, scored within a space of ten minutes from each other. They finished the month in seventh place on the league table, nine points behind leader Porto.

November–February
Benfica faced Marítimo in an away game at the beginning of November. They lost 0–3, to a hat-trick from Lagorio. Without a single road game victory, the team dropped to tenth in the league's standings. They hosted Farense in the second week of November and won 2–1. Van Hooijdonk and João Tomás scored a goal each, within a 4-minute interval just before the final whistle, to give their team the three points. On 18 November, Benfica played Vitória de Guimarães on the road. They took the lead near the end of the first half, with a goal from Chano. The second half saw three additional goals, all by João Tomás. It was their first win as visitors, and they climbed to sixth place in the standings. Benfica played their last game of the month, on the 26th, at the Taça de Portugal against Campomaiorense. This fourth round match was won thanks to a late goal by Sabry.

Benfica started December with a Derby de Lisboa game against Sporting. They won 3–0, with a first half goal by Van Hooijdonk and two goals in a five-minute span from João Tomás. Following the win, Mourinho requested a contract extension as a demonstration of faith in the work he had put in along with his assistant: "Me [Mourinho] and Mozer thought that the only way to end speculation and the constant threat of being sacked in the event of a bad result...was renewing our contracts for another season." Their proposal was not met. They parted ways with the club through an announcement in a press conference: "He [President Vilarinho] thought it was better not to accept our request. We understood that decision showed a lack of trust in our work, and that we should offer our resignation..." Benfica immediately appointed Toni – a long-time favourite of the President – as the new manager. On 10 December, Benfica played Alverca away from home. They opened the score sheet with a goal from João Tomás close to half-time, but Mantorras equalized. Later, Milinkovic put the Ribatejo side in the lead, resulting in the fourth loss in seven matches in away games for Benfica. In the last match of the year 2000, Benfica met a struggling Gil Vicente, who were at the bottom of the Primeira Liga standings. Unable to unlock the 0–0 draw, the club suffered their eighth winless league game of the season.

Early in January, Benfica played away from home, at Louletano, in a fifth round match of the Taça de Portugal. They won 3–1 and progressed to the next knock-out stage, where they would face Porto. Benfica resumed their league campaign on the 7th, visiting Salgueiros. They won their second away game, after Van Hooijdonk scored with nine minutes remaining on the clock. They went on to win their third match in a row on 13 January, with a 5–1 home-game win against Desportivo Aves. Benfica took an early lead with a Van Hooijdonk goal in the 15th minute, and added two more in the first half, one by Carlitos and another from an own goal. The Dutch striker added two more goals to his tally in the second half. On 17 January, Benfica received Porto for the first of three consecutive games against them. The first game was part of the Taça de Portugal and ended in a 1–1 draw. Maniche scored the lone Benfica goal before Maric equalized for Porto. A rematch was held to settle the tie. Four days later, on Sunday, Benfica hosted Porto for a Portuguese league match. They defeated the visitors 2–1, after a goal from Van Hooijdonk in the 81st minute. This win allowed the club to climb to fourth in the league's standings – their best position all year. The last of three games saw Benfica succumb to a four-nil loss in the rematch for the Portuguese Cup. Manuel Queiroz wrote: "...A thrashing that did not transpire what really happened in the field, because Fernando Santos' team – in the best performance of the season – completely demolished a Benfica that never entered the game..." Benfica's last game of the month was played on the road on the 29th, against the Aveiro side, Beira-Mar. The match ended with a 3–1 win for Benfica, after another double for Van Hooijdonk. João Tomás also got on the score sheet.

On 4 February, the team beat União de Leiria at home by 3 goals to 2. Benfica took the lead with a goal from João Tomás. Roger and Van Hooijdonk increased their lead by two goals, until Nuno Valente settled the final score. With this win, Benfica climbed to second place the league, now only five points behind leader Boavista. On the 16th, Benfica played Estrela da Amadora away from home. The game ended with a 2–1 victory for Benfica. Along with Boavista's loss in Braga, this further reduced Benfica's separation from the league leader. Benfica played their last match of February on the 25th against Boavista. Benfica had an opportunity to take the top place in the league table with a victory in that game, but they were unsuccessful at breaking the 0–0 draw. Van Hooijdonk had the best chance in the 78th minute, but his attempt struck the goalpost.

March–May
Benfica began March with an away game in Braga. They lost 3–1 in their first league loss since December. They dropped to fourth place in the standings. On the following Saturday, Benfica visited Belenenses and lost for a second time in a row. A week later, Benfica received Paços de Ferreira at home. The match ended with a 3–2 win for the visitors and Benfica dropped to fifth place. They were now eleven points behind leader Boavista. In the last game of March, Benfica faced Campomaiorense on the road. With a 1–1 draw, the team avoided losing all of their matches in March. However, their need to get points was aggravated, especially if they wanted to qualify for the European competitions.

In April, Benfica opened at home against Marítimo, with a squad composed mainly of reserve players. A 3–0 win helped get closer to both Braga and Sporting in the standings. On 13 April, Benfica visited Faro. The match ended in a 2–2 draw despite a Benfica having a first-half lead. Nine days later, Benfica played Vitória de Guimarães at home. A sole goal from Sabry in the 31st minute was enough to secure the team's second win in April. Closing out the month, Benfica travelled to Alvalade for the second Derby de Lisboa of the season. The game ended in a 3–0 loss for Benfica. This was the Lions' best result against Benfica since the 1986–87 season.

On 4 May, Benfica played Alverca at home, where they lost 0–2, and in the writing of João Querido Manhã for Record, the fans "burst into protests at the end, after they lost patience with the errors, passivity and lack of talent of the whole team.". On 13 May, Benfica went to Adelino Ribeiro Novo to face Gil Vicente. The game ended in a 3–0 defeat – their tenth loss within the league, matching their previous record in the 1996–97 season. As a result, the club was overtaken by Belenenses in the league table. A week later, Benfica played host to Salgueiros in Da Luz. A final score of 1–1 saved Benfica from a record fourth straight loss, and gave the Porto-based side their first point all season against a top 7 team. Benfica played the last game of the season against Desportivo de Aves on the road. At one point in the game, the team was losing three-nil, but managed to equalize and finish with a four-all draw. Toni stated that "Everyone did not do their best to avoid that a historic club slipped into a position that is not accustomed." Benfica finished in a record-breaking sixth place after the 34-game season with a tally of 15 wins, 9 draws and 10 losses that, together, summed up to 54 points. They were ninth-lowest league-wide in goals conceded – 44 in all. On the plus side, they were fifth best in the league at goal-scoring, with a total of 54 goals. Consequently, Benfica missed out on UEFA competitions for the first time in 41 years (since the 1959–60 season). Van Hooijdonk was the second most productive player in the Primeira Liga with 19 goals.

Results

Overall record

Primeira Liga

League table

Results by round

Matches

Taça de Portugal

UEFA Cup

First round

Friendlies

Player statistics
The squad for the season consisted of the players listed in the tables below, as well as staff members Heynckes (manager), Mourinho (manager), Toni (manager) and Mozer (assistant coach).

|-

|}

Transfers

In

Out

Out by loan

See also
 2000–01 in Portuguese football

References
Specific

General
 

S.L. Benfica seasons
Benfica